Gert Van den Bergh (16 October 1920 – 16 February 1968) was a South African film actor. He was married to Dulcie (Magdeld Magdalena) van den Bergh (23 August 1928 – 8 November 1997).
(Née Smit)

Career

Selected filmography

 Die Lig van 'n Eeu (1942)
 Pinkie se Erfenis (1946) - Willem
 Simon Beyers (1947) - Nicolaas Beyers
 Die Kaskenades van Dokter Kwak (1948) - Poggenpoel
 Hans-die-Skipper (1952) - Johan
 Inspan (1953) - Dirk de Vos
 'n Plan is 'n Boerdery (1954) - Wessel Maritz
 Vadertjie Langbeen (1955) - Jacques (voice, uncredited)
 Matieland! (1955) - MC at Fruit Festival (voice, uncredited)
 Dis Lekker om te Lewe (1957) - Commandant (voice, uncredited)
 Diamond Safari (1958) - Compound Manager
 Fratse in die Vloot (1958) - Seaman (voice, uncredited)
 Nooi van my Hart (1959) - Hans (voice, uncredited)
 Rip van Wyk (1960) - 'Oom'
 Die Vlugteling (1960) - Detective Sgt. Malan
 Basie (1961) - Police sergeant (voice, uncredited)
 The Hellions (1961) - Dr. Weiser
 Die Tweede Slaapkamer (1962) - van Dyk
 Tom Dirk en Herrie (1962) - Grové
 Stropers van die Laeveld (1962)
 Jy's Lieflik Vanaand (1962) - Anton Fourie
 Die Ruiter in die Nag (1963) - Lodewyk van Renen
 Mozambique (1964) - The Arab
 Zulu (1964) - Lieutenant Josef Adendorff
 Piet my Niggie (1964) - Radio announcer (voice, uncredited)
 Victim Five (1964) - Vanberger
 Seven Against the Sun (1964) - Cpl. Smit
 Tokoloshe (1965)
 Debbie (1965) - Dr. Chris Hugo
 The Naked Prey (1965) - 2nd Man
 Diamond Walkers (1965) - Piet Truter
 King Hendrik (1965) - Koos de Wet
 Die Wonderwêreld van Kammie Kamfer (1965)
 Sandy the Seal (1965) - Jacobson
 Der Rivonia-Prozess (1966) - Alan Paton
 The Second Sin (1966) - Anton Rossouw
 Wild Season (1967) - Dirk Maritz
 The Professor and the Beauty Queen (1967) - Dr. Koos Hattingh
 The Jackals (1967) - Drunk (uncredited)
 Die Kandidaat (1968) - Lourens Niemand
 Rider in the Night (1968)

References

External links
 
 Gert Van den Bergh at the British Film Institute Film and Television Database

1920 births
1968 deaths
Afrikaner people
South African people of Dutch descent
Male actors from Cape Town
People from Johannesburg
South African male film actors
20th-century South African male actors